Brandsø is a small, uninhabited Danish island located in Little Belt between Jutland and Funen, 15 km to the north-west of Assens. It has an area of 2.0 km2 it lies in Middelfart Municipality and belongs to the Wedellsborg estate. The hilly island is formed by glacial moraines  and has a large bog at its centre and forested areas to the east. It is used for hunting.

In the 1920s, Brandsø had a population of around 50 but was gradually depopulated and has been uninhabited since the late 1960s. In 1974 it was listed as one of 15 possible locations for a Danish nuclear power plant.

See also
 List of islands of Denmark

References

Uninhabited islands of Denmark
Middelfart Municipality